Neorapana muricata is a species of sea snail, a marine gastropod mollusk in the family Muricidae, the murex snails or rock snails.

Description

Distribution

References

 Claremont, M., Vermeij, G. J., Williams, S. T. & Reid, D. G. (2013). Global phylogeny and new classification of the Rapaninae (Gastropoda: Muricidae), dominant molluscan predators on tropical rocky seashores. Molecular Phylogenetics and Evolution. 66: 91–102.

External links
 Broderip, W. J. (1832). New species of shells collected by Mr. Cuming on the western coast of south America and in the islands of the South Pacific Ocean. Proceedings of the Committee of Science and Correspondence of the Zoological Society of London. 2: 124-126

Muricidae
Gastropods described in 1832